The Winter Building is a historic building in Montgomery, Alabama, U.S. The 3-story structure was built as a bank branch with a telegraph office upstairs.

History
The building was erected from 1841 to 1843 for John Gindrat, a cotton broker and banker. It was inherited by his daughter, Mary Elizabeth Gindrat, and her husband, Joseph S. Winter, in 1854.

During the American Civil War of 1861–1865, the second floor was home to the Southern Telegraph Company.  It was there that LeRoy Pope Walker, the Confederate States Secretary of War, sent a telegram to General P. G. T. Beauregard to advise him to fire on Fort Sumter, and thus start the Battle of Fort Sumter.

It remained in the same family as late as the 1970s, when it was used for offices and a clothing store.

Architectural significance
The building was designed in the Italianate architectural style. It has been listed on the National Register of Historic Places since January 14, 1972.

References

National Register of Historic Places in Alabama
Italianate architecture in Alabama
Buildings and structures completed in 1843
Buildings and structures in Montgomery, Alabama